Weiden Zentrum is a Kölner Verkehrs-Betriebe station. Line 1 of the Stadtbahn serves this station. The station is also served by buses, and buses on routes 141 and 149 terminate at the station.

See also 
 List of Cologne KVB stations

References 

 

Cologne-Bonn Stadtbahn stations
Cologne KVB stations
Lindenthal, Cologne